Abbadbibi (also Romanized as Ābbādbībī) is a village in Nurabad Rural District, in the Central District of Manujan County, Kerman Province, Iran. At the 2006 census, its population was 299, in 74 families.

References 

Populated places in Manujan County